Agot Deng Jogaak is a South Sudanese beauty pageant titleholder who was crowned as Miss Earth South Sudan 2015. She is the first South Sudanese under the Miss South Sudan Foundation headed by the Miss Earth South Sudan 2009, Aheu Deng.

Pageantry

Miss South Sudan 2014
Agot was crowned as Miss South Sudan 2014. The event was held at the freedom hall in Juba. Agot was offered a brand new car while the second runner up walked away with £6,000 SSP and the third given £4,000 SSP. The judges of the beauty pageant consisted of three ladies namely Kevina Aber, Rebecca Yom, Alue Gai Manyang and Engineer Khodor Zeinedden.

Miss Earth 2015
By winning the Miss South Sudan 2014, Agot is South Sudan's representative to be Miss Earth 2015 and would try to succeed Jamie Herrell as the next Miss Earth. However, she failed to go to Vienna, Austria due to visa problem.

References

Miss Earth 2015 contestants
Living people
1990s births